Proeulia griseiceps is a species of moth of the family Tortricidae. It is found on the Juan Fernández Islands off the coast of Chile.

References

Moths described in 1922
Proeulia
Endemic fauna of Chile